شرکت خزر
Jafarabad-e Jangal (also Romanized as Ja‘farābād-e Jangal; also known as Ja‘farābād) is a village in Khalazir Rural District, Aftab District, Tehran County, Tehran Province, Iran. At the 2006 census, its population was 386, in 98 families.

References 

Populated places in Tehran County